Fomitiporia mediterranea is a fungus species in the genus Fomitiporia associated with esca of grapevine.

References

External links

 

Hymenochaetaceae
Fungi described in 2002
Grapevine trunk diseases